Meharia hackeri is a moth in the family Cossidae. It is found in Socotra, Yemen.

The wingspan is 21–22 mm. The ground colour of the forewings is yellowish brown with white longitudinal fascia forming the wing pattern.

Etymology
The species name is dedicated to Hermann Hacker, a prominent German lepidopterist, who has contributed much to the investigation of macro-moths of the Arabian peninsula and Africa.

References

Moths described in 2011
Meharia
Endemic fauna of Socotra